For schools of similar names, see Portland School.

Portland School was a specialist Science College situated in Worksop, United Kingdom.

The headteacher upon closing was Elaine Hamilton. The original school buildings were situated on Sparken Hill Worksop, and were built for when the school opened in 1956. The current school building, which is situated on Netherton road, was built in 2007.  Portland School was in special measures, as it had an inadequate report from OFSTED after an inspection in March 2010, before its closure.

Early history

Technical school
The Winifred Portland County Technical Grammar School opened in September 1956. Previous to that there had been a Secondary Technical School separate from but within the Technical College on Blyth Road. The staff and pupils transferred to Winifred Portland when it opened. The school then became the Winifred Portland Technical Grammar school until it was renamed Portland Comprehensive and merged with both the Central and Priory Secondary Schools

Grammar school
Henry Hartland Grammar School opened in 1962, being officially opened on 21 June 1963 by Eric James, Baron James of Rusholme.

Comprehensive schools
In 1970 Worksop's secondary schools became comprehensive - The Hartland School and Portland Comprehensive School.

Merger with Hartland 
In late 2003 the decision was made to merge the school with the Hartland secondary school which was north and next door to Portland school. This merger happened in 2004 though not without concerns by some parents . The merge with the Hartland site created a site with: three canteens, two science blocks, two assembly halls, three outdoor sports courts including two large barn buildings, three fields including one large field equivalent to 9 football pitches.

Move to new site 
Building of the new school site began in early 2006 with a contract between Nottinghamshire County Council, and Transform Schools. The work was completed in time for students to move in after the Christmas break, in early 2008. The former site was  demolished soon after in mid 2008. The new school facilities include: one canteen, one large assembly hall with seating for 300 persons, three outdoor sports spaces including a floodlit Astroturf, a MUGA (Multi Use Games Area), and a large field, two indoor sports halls, and a small gym room with weights, running and rowing machines. The building was smaller than the cumulative size of the former Portland buildings and surrounding walkways

Further education
On 3 September 2008 Worksop Post-16 Centre opened as a consolidated site for further education in Worksop. The centre is situated on Valley Road, adjacent to Valley School.

Courses consist primarily of A-levels across a range of art, humanity and science subjects.

Academic performance
Portland School had often achieved GCSE results below the national average.
The School achieved its highest GCSE results ever in 2011.

Closure
On 20 July 2011 the school officially closed to become part of the Outwood Grange of Schools and became Outwood Academy Portland upon reopening for the new school term.

Notable former pupils

Henry Hartland Grammar School
Cynthia Bower, controversial first Chief Executive of the Care Quality Commission
Anna Soubry (became comprehensive in her third year), MP for Broxtowe, and former local television journalist from 1984-92 for Central News East

Hartland School
 Rory Palmer, Labour MEP for the East Midlands

Portland Comprehensive School
Kevan Jones, Labour MP since 2001 for North Durham
Luke Wood, cricketer for Nottinghamshire
Lee Thompson

References

External links
Listing on schoolsnet.com
Worksop Guardian article "Improved attendance Worksop's Portland School says new head". 

Defunct schools in Nottinghamshire
Educational institutions established in 1956
Educational institutions disestablished in 2011
Worksop
1956 establishments in England
2011 disestablishments in England